What Doesn't Kill Me... is the eighth studio album by Hungarian heavy metal band Ektomorf. The title alludes to the Nietzsche quote.

Track listing 

 All lyrics and music written by Zoltán Farkas, except lyrics of "Sick of It All" by Zoltán Farkas and Lord Nelson.

Personnel
 Zoltán Farkas — vocals, guitars
 Tamás Schrottner — guitars
 Szabolcs Murvai — bass
 József Szakács — drums

References

External links
https://www.discogs.com/Ektomorf-What-Doesnt-Kill-Me/release/2440488
http://www.metal-temple.com/site/catalogues/entry/reviews/cd_3/e_2/ektomorf_-_what_doesnt.htm
http://www.blabbermouth.net/news/ektomorf-to-release-redemption-in-december/
http://www.blabbermouth.net/news/ektomorf-it-s-up-to-you-video-posted-online/

2009 albums
Ektomorf albums
AFM Records albums
Albums produced by Tue Madsen